Darbishire is a surname. Notable people with the surname include:

Arthur Dukinfield Darbishire (1879–1915), British zoologist
Charles Darbishire (1875–1925), British Liberal politician and East India merchant
Godfrey Darbishire (1853–1889),  English rugby union player
Helen Darbishire (1881–1961), English literary scholar
Henry Astley Darbishire (1825–1899), British architect
Robert Dukinfield Darbishire (1826–1908), English lawyer and philanthropist
Geoffrey Paul Darbishire
(1952-), Tunnel engineer. Excavated the mid-point on the Marine Service Tunnel, Channel Tunnel 08/06/1990

Fictional characters
Charles Edwin Jeremy Darbishire, the school friend of John Jennings in the Jennings novels by Anthony Buckeridge

Other
Darbishire Quad, a building and quad of Somerville College, Oxford

See also
Darbyshire
Derbyshire, English county